Vendela Maria Kirsebom (born 12 January 1967) is a Norwegian-Swedish model, television host, and actress.

Early life
Kirsebom was born in Stockholm, Sweden, to a Norwegian mother and a Turkish father. 

At the age of 13, she was discovered in a Stockholm restaurant by Eileen Ford. At 18, she graduated from the Oslo Waldorf School («Rudolf Steinerskolen i Oslo») and moved to Italy to pursue a modeling career under the guidance of Ford Models.

Career 
Contracted with Elizabeth Arden, she moved to the United States to work as Almay's spokesperson.

Kirsebom has appeared on the magazine covers of Bride's (US), Flare (Canada), Shape (US), FHM (UK), and Zest (US) and has been featured multiple times in the pages of the Sports Illustrated Swimsuit Issue.

She appeared in Batman and Robin in 1997 as Nora Fries; and (as Vendela K. Thomessen) in 1998 played the bridal gown model in The Parent Trap, which starred Lindsay Lohan, Natasha Richardson, and Dennis Quaid. She was also featured in the Disney Channel's Model Behavior with Justin Timberlake and Maggie Lawson.

She appeared as herself in 1995 episodes of The Larry Sanders Show and Murphy Brown, as well as the 2005 TV-movie sequel Romy and Michele: In the Beginning. Kirsebom made a cameo as a "space villainess" in a "Pigs in Space" skit on Muppets Tonight. She also lent her voice to a fictionalized version of herself on Johnny Bravo.

In 1999, she hosted the Swedish music competition Melodifestivalen 1999. 

From 2006 to 2008, she hosted the Norwegian version of Top Model, and also hosted the fourth cycle of the Swedish version in 2007.

Personal life
In 1996, Kirsebom married Norwegian politician Olaf Thommessen, a Roman Catholic of French and Norwegian descent. They separated in 2007 after 11 years of marriage and Kirsebom moved to Oslo with their two daughters, Julia and Hannah. 

In addition to Swedish, Norwegian and Danish, she speaks German, Italian and English fluently. 

She remains active in modeling and is a Goodwill Ambassador for UNICEF.

In 2019, boyfriend Petter Pilgaard proposed to Kirsebom. Due to the COVID-19 pandemic the wedding was postponed, but they finally married in June 2022.

Filmography

Film

Television

References

External links

 Aftonbladet, "Jag vet inget om min pappa", 11 December 2006
 Aftonbladet, "Vi måste alla hjälpa barn", 18 June 2001

1967 births
Living people
Actresses from Stockholm
Swedish female models
Norwegian female models
Norwegian people of Turkish descent
Swedish people of Norwegian descent
Swedish people of Turkish descent
Waldorf school alumni
Spouses of Norwegian politicians
Models from Oslo